Romain Grégoire (born 21 January 2003) is a French road cyclist, who currently rides for UCI WorldTeam .

Major results

Road

2020
 1st  Road race, National Junior Championships
 2nd Overall La Philippe Gilbert Juniors
2021
 1st  Road race, UEC European Junior Championships
 National Junior Road Championships
1st  Road race
1st  Time trial
 1st Overall Ain Bugey Valromey Tour
1st Stage 5
 1st Trofeo Guido Dorigo
 1st Gran Premio Eccellenze Valli del Soligo
 2nd  Road race, UCI World Junior Championships
 4th Overall Course de la Paix Juniors
 4th Overall Driedaagse van Axel
1st Stage 3
 5th Overall Aubel–Thimister–Stavelot
1st Stage 3
 5th Paris–Roubaix Juniors
2022
 1st Liège–Bastogne–Liège Espoirs
 1st G.P. Palio del Recioto
 1st Giro del Belvedere
 1st Flèche Ardennaise
 Giro Ciclistico d'Italia
1st  Points classification
1st Stage 7
 1st Stage 6 Tour de l'Avenir
 2nd Overall Alpes Isère Tour
1st  Young rider classification
2023
 5th Faun-Ardèche Classic
 6th Trofeo Laigueglia
 8th Strade Bianche

Cyclo-cross
2019–2020
 Junior EKZ CrossTour
1st Hittnau
3rd Meilen
 3rd Flückiger Cross Madiswi Juniors
2020–2021
 2nd Internationales Radquer Steinmaur Juniors
2021–2022
 1st  National Under-23 Championships

References

External links

2003 births
Living people
French male cyclists
Sportspeople from Besançon
Cyclo-cross cyclists
Cyclists from Bourgogne-Franche-Comté
21st-century French people